Chionato (before 1928: Γκέρλιανη - Gkerliani) is a village in Kastoria Regional Unit, Macedonia, Greece. Administratively it belongs to the Akrites Municipal Unit of Nestorio Municipality in Western Macedonia. 

It is located in the western part of the regional unit on the northern side of the Ammouda peak at an altitude of 960m. with 118 permanent residents (2011 Greek census) and is 31 km away from the city of Kastoria.

There is a municipal guest house in the settlement, there is a Greek Orthodox church of Saint Nicholas (1922) and a football field named after "Christina Giazitzidou" in honor of the Olympic rower Christina Giazitzidou, who is originally from Chionato.

Demographics 

The Greek census (1920) recorded 736 people in the village and in 1923 there were 710 inhabitants (or 110 families) who were Muslim. Following the Greek-Turkish population exchange, in 1926 within Gkerliani there were 58 refugee families from Asia Minor and 29 refugee families from Pontus. The Greek census (1928) recorded 326 village inhabitants. There were 87 refugee families (331 people) in 1928.

Notable people 

 Christina Giazitzidou, Greek rower, originally from Chionato, who won a bronze medal at the 2012 Summer Olympics in London

References

Populated places in Kastoria (regional unit)
Villages in Greece